

Governors between years 1921–1958

Governors between years 1958-present

References 

Governorates of Iraq
Governors of Erbil Governorate
Erbil